Kodit Khurd is a small village of Purandar taluka in Pune District of Maharashtra State, India, situated on Bank of Karha River.

References

Pune district